John Lavery (1877 – after 1898) was an English professional footballer who played as a winger for Sunderland.

References

1877 births
English footballers
Association football wingers
Sunderland A.F.C. players
Burton Swifts F.C. players
Hebburn Argyle F.C. players
English Football League players
Year of death missing